Cuore matto... matto da legare (Italian for Mad heart... mad as a hatter) is a 1967 Italian "musicarello" film directed by Mario Amendola. It is named after the Little Tony's hit song "Cuore matto".

Plot    
Tony, a young singer who has returned to Rome from the United States, meets Carla at the airport, a beautiful architecture student he falls in love with.

The boy, who wants to continue the musical activity, forms a band with two friends, Marco and Sandro, also managing to perform live and get noticed by a Rai official: his parents, however, who are against these choices and they would prefer to see their son working in their butcher shop, they try to arrange a marriage for him with a girl friend of the family, Cesira, to make him settle down.

While Tony is walking with Cesira trying to get rid of her, he is seen by Carla who, jealous, decides not to see him again: the intervention of the two friends Marco and Sandro, who suggest that he invent a twin brother, Pompeo, who would be been walking with Cesira in Tony's place, instead of being decisive it will complicate things.

In the end, after some ups and downs, the story will end with a happy ending for the two young people.

Cast 
 Little Tony: Tony  
 Eleonora Brown: Carla 
 Ferruccio Amendola: Sandro 
 Rossella Bergamonti: Camilla 
 Anna Campori: Teresa 
 Maria Pia Casilio: Erminia
 Lucio Flauto: Marco  
 Elsa Vazzoler: Cesira 
 Ignazio Leone: Lo Pece  
 Alfredo Rizzo: Ravazzetti  
 Alberto Sorrentino

References

External links

Cuore matto... matto da legare at Variety Distribution

1967 films
Musicarelli
1967 musical comedy films
Films directed by Mario Amendola
1960s Italian films